The Northern Iowa Panthers wrestling team represents the University of Northern Iowa and competes in the Big 12 Conference. The Panthers are one-time Division I National Champions and four-time National Runners-up. The team is coached by Doug Schwab.

The University of Northern Iowa Wrestling team, founded in 1923, won the NCAA (Single division) national championship in 1950 and the NCAA Division II national championships in 1975 and 1978. They competed in the Western Wrestling Conference until 2012, when UNI became an associate member of the Mid-American Conference since the Missouri Valley Conference is a non-wrestling conference. The Panthers continued to compete in the MAC through the 2016–17 season, after which they moved to the Big 12.

Doug Schwab is the current head coach for the Northern Iowa Wrestling Team. Mission Statement - To communicate with UNI wrestling fans to support, encourage, promote a successful UNI wrestling tradition.

In the 2013-2014 season, head coach Doug Schwab led the Panthers to a perfect 13-0 season in dual meets, the only division one wrestling team to go undefeated.

Northern Iowa Panther Wrestling Team Accomplishments:

NCAA (Single division) Team Champions in 1950
NCAA Division II Team Champions in 1975
NCAA Division II Team Champions in 1978
NCAA (Single division) Team Runner-Up in 1946, 1947, 1949 and 1952
NCAA Division II Team Runner-Up in 1970, 1972, 1974 and 1980
NCAA (Single division) Team Third Place in 1937
NCAA Division II Team Third Place in 1963, 1967, 1969, 1976, 1977 and 1979.

Notable wrestlers:

 Olympic Gold Medalist (1952) William Smith wrestled for Iowa State Teachers College (1949 and 1950 NCAA champion)
 Olympic Silver Medalist (1948) Gerald Leeman wrestled for Iowa State Teachers College (1946 NCAA champion)
 Pan American Games Gold Medalist (1975) Mike McCready
 Pan American Games Gold Medalist (1993) Justin Greenlee
 Pan American Games Silver Medalist (1990) Mark Pustelnik
 Three-time NCAA Champion (1946-47-48) Bill Koll and member of the 1948 U.S. Olympic team, finishing 5th
 Three-time NCAA Champion (1947, 1949–50) Bill Nelson and member of the 1948 U.S. Olympic team
 Three-time NCAA Champion (1949-50-51) Keith Young
 Three-time NCAA Division II Champion (1976-77-78) Gary Bentrim
 Three-time NCAA Division II Champion (1978-79-80) and six-time All-American Kirk Myers
NCAA Division I Champion 149 pounds (2000) Tony Davis.
NCAA Division I Champion 184 pounds (2019) Drew Foster.

References

External links